Michael Oliveri is the Bram Stoker Award-winning author of Deadliest of the Species. His work has appeared in several anthologies and magazines including A Walk on the Darkside, New Dark Voices, The Best of Horrorfind, and the upcoming In Laymon’s Terms. He is one of the collaborators on the fan-favorite 4×4 collection with Brian Keene, Geoff Cooper, and Michael T. Huyck Jr.  Oliveri wrote the comic Werewolves: Call of the Wild from Moonstone Books.

Bibliography
Books
Deadliest of the Species (2001)
The Pack: Winter Kill (2009)
 
Collections
4 × 4 (2001) (with Geoff Cooper, Michael T Huyck, Brian Keene)
New Dark Voices (2004) (with Gene O'Neill and John Urbancik)
Muy Mal co-written with John Urbancik, and Weston Ochse
Inazuma free short story

Awards
Bram Stoker Award First Novel winner (2002): Deadliest of the Species

Personal information
Mike currently resides near Peoria, IL
Mike studies Shuri-ryū karate under Sensei Trent Miller and Shihan Joseph Walker

See also

List of horror fiction authors

External links
Michael Oliveri's Official Website

21st-century American novelists
American horror writers
American fantasy writers
American male novelists
Year of birth missing (living people)
Living people
21st-century American male writers